Younger Now is the sixth studio album by American singer-songwriter Miley Cyrus. It was released on September 29, 2017, by RCA Records. Cyrus began planning a commercial follow-up record to her fourth album Bangerz while simultaneously making her experimental fifth album Miley Cyrus & Her Dead Petz in 2015, although later became influenced by her reconciliation with fiancé Liam Hemsworth in 2016. Younger Now was written and produced by Cyrus and Oren Yoel, with whom she had collaborated on her previous two full-lengths. Not concerning herself with radio airplay, their efforts resulted in an "honest" final product that sees Cyrus "leaning into her roots." It features guest vocals from singer Dolly Parton, Cyrus' godmother. Musically, it is a country pop and pop rock record.

Younger Now received mixed reviews from music critics, who felt that the songwriting and production lacked substance. It debuted at number five on the US Billboard 200. "Malibu" and "Younger Now" were released as singles, with the former track being certified double platinum by the Recording Industry Association of America (RIAA) and peaking at number ten on the Billboard Hot 100.

Looking to remove herself from the provocative reputation she had developed while promoting Bangerz and Miley Cyrus & Her Dead Petz, promotional efforts for Younger Now associated Cyrus with an increasingly conservative image. She performed during several television programs, including the Billboard Music Awards and MTV Video Music Awards, before stating the month following the release of the album that she would neither release any further singles from the record nor tour for it, so she could focus on her work on The Voice.

Background and development
After a three-year break from music, Cyrus released her fourth album Bangerz in 2013. She worked with mainstream producers to attract new listeners, and developed a sexually provocative image, which is credited with reviving Cyrus' career and turning her into a pop music icon. She followed that with a psychedelic album, Miley Cyrus & Her Dead Petz, which was released for free on SoundCloud in 2015. It received mixed reviews, and Cyrus generated accusations of cultural appropriation for her wearing dreadlocks during promotional activities for the album. Cyrus also came out as pansexual in 2015, nearly a year after establishing the Happy Hippie Foundation to support homeless and LGBT youth.

Cyrus became a coach on The Voice in 2016, and spent time campaigning for Hillary Clinton during the presidential election after Bernie Sanders, the candidate Cyrus originally endorsed, lost the Democratic nomination to Clinton. Cyrus admitted to being saddened by Clinton's loss and the strong political divide of the nation, and decided to return to her country roots and wholesome image to try to reach out to conservatives.

Two weeks before Younger Now was released, Cyrus stated that she was "over [the album]" and was "already two songs deep on the next one," which would become the EP She Is Coming (2019). In December 2018, Cyrus acknowledged that the musical direction of Younger Now "wasn't exactly the home for [her]" and credited producer Mark Ronson with "[helping her] carve out [her] sound, where [she] could do everything that [she wanted], which is more modern" for the follow-up record. She later stated that elements of the follow-up album could be related to the "country-influenced things that [she] did on Younger Now."

Composition
Younger Now is considered a country pop and pop rock record. It written by Cyrus and Oren Yoel, with whom Cyrus first collaborated on the Bangerz track "Adore You" in 2013.

Promotion

Release

Cyrus' then-untitled sixth studio album was first discussed in a Billboard cover story published in May 2017. On August 7, she announced that the record would be titled Younger Now and would be released on September 29. It was made available for preorder on August 18. The album was available on CD, digital download, and streaming on the release date; a vinyl pressing followed on February 9, 2018.

Singles
The lead single "Malibu" was announced on May 3, 2017, and released with its music video on May 11. It debuted at number 64 on the US Billboard Hot 100, and peaked at number ten the following week. The track was certified double-platinum by the Recording Industry Association of America (RIAA) in January 2019. The second and final single, title track "Younger Now", was released with its music video on August 18. It peaked at number 79 on the Billboard Hot 100. Promotional singles "Inspired" and "Week Without You" were released on June 9 and September 21, respectively. On October 30, Cyrus confirmed there would be no further singles and that she would not be touring in support of Younger Now.

Live performances

Cyrus first performed the album's lead single, "Malibu", at Wango Tango on May 13. She sang "Malibu" again at the Billboard Music Awards and The Voice on May 21 and 22, respectively. She performed the song again on The Today Show on May 26 as a part of their Citi Concert series. That same day, she also made a surprise guest appearance on The Tonight Show Starring Jimmy Fallon to promote her musical guest spot on Late Night with Seth Meyers later that night. Cyrus was also a performer at the One Love Manchester benefit concert on June 4. Cyrus performed "Malibu" and "Inspired" on Fallon on June 14. On August 22, Cyrus launched a website, youngernow.com, where fans could upload photos onto the artwork of the "Younger Now" single. On August 27, Cyrus performed "Younger Now" for the first time at the MTV Video Music Awards. On September 7, Cyrus performed the song on The Ellen DeGeneres Show.

From October 2 to October 6, Cyrus made appearances on The Tonight Show Starring Jimmy Fallon and performed "Week Without You". On November 4, she performed "Bad Mood" and "I Would Die for You" on Saturday Night Live.

Critical reception

At Metacritic, Younger Now received a weighted score of 58 out of 100 from review aggregate website Metacritic, indicating "mixed or average reviews", based on 17 reviews from music critics. Stephen Thomas Erlewine of AllMusic gave Younger Now 3.5 stars out of 5, saying the album "seems slightly scattered as it flits from song to song, it nevertheless adds up to a portrait of a pop star so confident of her swagger, she doesn't bother with such niceties as old-fashioned flow." Dave Simpson of The Guardian opined, "On Younger Now, she has taken control of the songwriting and production and emerges as a conservative, big-lunged, country-tinged pop star with songs about breaking free." Pitchfork writer Claire Lobenfeld rated the album 4.7 out of 10, citing "Bland production and weak songwriting hamstring the personalized nature of Younger Now, making it merely a suggestion of the kind of artist Miley Cyrus could be." Spins Jordan Sargent called Younger Now Cyrus' "least honest album ever", further stating: "Where her past albums felt messy but painfully sincere, Younger Now comes off as safe and overly sanitized, with the frisson that made Cyrus a star all but entirely blasted away." Billboard highlighted the progressive nature of one of the tracks, "She's Not Him", by saying it legitimizes bisexual and pansexual identities.

In November 2018, Mike Wass from Idolator commented that Younger Now was "a potent reminder that you don't need dozens of collaborators and an A&R team the size of Texas to make an excellent pop album" despite not being "the sequel to Bangerz that [her fanbase] secretly wanted" and not having "obvious singles." He felt that the title track combined the "pop hooks and meme-friendly lyrics" of "Malibu" with the "mood and emotion" of the album, and "holds up as a warm ray of light in Miley's discography" whose underwhelming performance was inexplicable.

Controversy
Cyrus' comments on growing distant from hip hop culture in her Billboard cover story sparked controversy in May 2017. That month, she clarified that "[she] respects all artists who speak their truth and appreciate all genres of music" and elaborated on her preference for "uplifting, conscious rap", citing Kendrick Lamar as an example, over the sex- and materialism-based lyrics that she explained "pushed [her] out of the hip-hop scene a little" in the article. Cyrus issued another apology in the comments of a YouTube video titled "Miley Cyrus Is My Problematic Fav...Sorry" in June 2019, where she wrote that "[she] fucked up and [she] sincerely apologizes" and expressed regret that "[her] words became a divider in a time where togetherness and unity is crucial."

Commercial performance
Younger Now debuted at number five on the US Billboard 200 with first-week figures of 45,000 album-equivalent units, of which 33,000 were traditional sales. It placed behind Shania Twain's Now (137,000 units), Tom Petty and the Heartbreakers' Greatest Hits (84,000 units), Demi Lovato's Tell Me You Love Me (74,000 units), and A Boogie wit da Hoodie's The Bigger Artist (67,000 units). The charting earned Cyrus her eleventh top-ten entry in the United States, including material she recorded as Hannah Montana, and marked her first entry there since Bangerz debuted at number one in 2013. In its second week on the chart, Younger Now fell to number 36.

Younger Now debuted at number eight on the UK Albums Chart with 10,024 copies sold in its first week, becoming her fifth top 10 album in the United Kingdom. It also became her fourth top 10 album in Australia after Breakout (which topped the charts), Can't Be Tamed (which reached number four), and Bangerz (which also reached the top position), entering at number two on the ARIA Albums Chart. The record became her eighth overall top 10 entry in Canada, combining both music under her real name and while performing as the character Hannah Montana, debuting at number three in the country.

Track listing
All lyrics written by Miley Cyrus. All music and production by Cyrus and Oren Yoel, with additional songwriting from Dolly Parton on "Rainbowland".

Credits and personnel
Credits adapted from AllMusic.

 Miley Cyrus – vocals, writer, producer, executive producer, art direction, design
 Oren Yoel – producer, writer, instrumentation, horn arrangements, string arrangements
 Dolly Parton – vocals, writer 
 Jamie Arentzen – guitar
 Jaco Caraco – guitar
 Nicole Row – bass
 Paul Dateh – violin
 Jerry Johnson – cello
 Matt Walker – cello
 Taylor Andrew Covey – trombone
 Antoine Séverman – fiddle
 Adam Wolf – French horn
 Harris Majors Ostrander – trumpet
 Paul Franklin – pedal steel
 Stacy Jones – drum, musical director
 Doran Dina – engineer
 Tom Rutledge – vocal engineer 
 Paul David Hager – mixing, engineer
 Manny Marroquin – mixing
 Chris Galland – mixing engineer
 Jeff Fitzpatrick – assistant engineer
 Scott Moore – assistant engineer
 Mark Ralston – assistant engineer
 Scott Desmarais – mixing assistant
 Robin Florent – mixing assistant
 Dave Kutch – mastering
 Pres Rodriguez – art direction, design
 Olivia Malone – cover art, photography
 Brian Bowen-Smith – photography
 Liam Hemsworth – photography
 Ryan Kenny – photography

Charts

Weekly charts

Monthly charts

Certifications

Release history

References

External links
 

2017 albums
Miley Cyrus albums
RCA Records albums
Country pop albums
Country albums by American artists